The 1891 college football season was the season of American football played among colleges and universities in the United States during the 1891–92 academic year. 

The 1891 Yale Bulldogs football team, led by head coach Walter Camp, compiled a perfect 13–0 record, outscored opponents by a total of 488 to 0, and has been recognized as the national champion by the Billingsley Report, Helms Athletic Foundation, Houlgate System, National Championship Foundation, and Parke H. Davis. Yale's 1891 season was part of a 37-game winning streak that began at the end of the 1890 season and continued into the 1893 season.

In the Midwest, Kansas led the way with a 7–0–1 record. In the South, Trinity (now known as Duke) was recognized as the champion.

Ten of the eleven players selected by Caspar Whitney to the 1891 All-America college football team came from the Big Three (Yale, Harvard, and Princeton).  The eleventh player was center John Adams from Penn. Five of the honorees have been inducted into the College Football Hall of Fame: quarterback Philip King (Princeton), halfback Lee McClung (Yale), end Frank Hinkey (Yale), tackle Marshall Newell (Harvard), and guard Pudge Heffelfinger (Yale).

Conference and program changes

Awards and honors

All-Americans

The consensus All-America team included:

Statistical leaders
Player scoring most points: Bernard Trafford, Harvard, 270

Conference standings
The following is a potentially incomplete list of conference standings:

Independents

References